Dyomsky (Dim) is a rural locality (a selo) and the administrative centre of Dyomsky Selsoviet, Bizhbulyaksky District, Bashkortostan, Russia. The population was 1,028 as of 2010. There are 11 streets.

Geography 
Dyomsky is located 24 km southeast of Bizhbulyak (the district's administrative centre) by road. Tuksanbayevo is the nearest rural locality.

References 

Rural localities in Bizhbulyaksky District